Polk Township is one of eleven townships in Monroe County, Indiana. As of the 2010 census, its population was 360 and it contained 195 housing units. It is one of the least densely-populated townships in the state; this is largely because most of the land is occupied by Lake Monroe, the Hoosier National Forest, and seasonal homes and attractions.

History
Polk Township was established in 1849. It was established soon after the term of its namesake, James K. Polk, had ended.

Epsilon II Archaeological Site and Kappa V Archaeological Site are listed on the National Register of Historic Places.

Geography

Unincorporated towns
 Chapel Hill at 
 Yellowstone at 
(This list is based on USGS data and may include former settlements.)

Cemeteries
The township contains these four cemeteries: Burgoon Church, Hillenburg, Mitchell and Todd.

School districts
 Monroe County Community School Corporation

Political districts
 Indiana's 9th congressional district
 State House District 60
 State Senate District 44

References

External links
 Indiana Township Association
 United Township Association of Indiana
 City-Data.com page for Polk Township

 United States Census Bureau 2008 TIGER/Line Shapefiles
 IndianaMap

Townships in Monroe County, Indiana
Bloomington metropolitan area, Indiana
Townships in Indiana